Pylaiella littoralis is a species of alga belonging to the family Acinetosporaceae.

Synonym:
 Conferva littoralis Linnaeus (= basionym)
 Pilayella littoralis

References

Ectocarpales